Rai Südtirol is a German language radio station produced by the Italian public-service broadcasting network RAI from its studios in Bolzano. The station programming is aimed to the German-speaking listeners in South Tyrol.

Transmissions began in 1960. The schedules also include a number of programmes in Ladin language.
From 22 till 06 Rai Radio 3 programming is being broadcast.

External links
 RAI Südtirol Official website (in German)

German-language mass media in South Tyrol
German-language radio stations
Radio stations established in 1960
1960 establishments in Italy
Radio stations in Italy
RAI radio stations
Mass media in Bolzano